Chen Fu-hai (born 3 June 1963) is a Taiwanese politician. He was the Magistrate of Kinmen County from 2014 to 2018, and again since 25 December 2022 as an independent politician.

Education
Chen obtained his bachelor's degree from the Department of Public Executive Science of National Open University. He then obtained his master's degree in public administration from National University of Kaohsiung and doctoral degree (candidate) also in public administration from Huazhong University of Science and Technology in Hubei.

Early political career
Chen was a member of the Kinmen County Council from 1994 to 1998. He was the mayor of Jinhu Township from 1998 to 2006.

Chen was elected as a legislator on 12 January 2008.

Magistracy

2014 Kinmen County magistrate election
Chen was elected as the Magistrate of Kinmen County after winning the 2014 Kinmen County magistrate election held on 29 November 2014.

2015 Zhang Zhijun visit to Kinmen
During the two-day visit of Taiwan Affairs Office Director Zhang Zhijun to Kinmen, Chen wished that Beijing would enhance their assistance to Kinmen because people on both sides of the Taiwan Straits are close like family and could work together to achieve the Chinese Dream.

2015 Strait Forum
During the 7th Straits Forum in Xiamen, Fujian in June 2015, Chen said that he would strive to support Kinmen to become a pilot zone for trade and economic cooperation between the two sides of the Taiwan Straits.

2018 Kinmen County magistrate election

References

External links
 

1963 births
Living people
Magistrates of Kinmen County
Kinmen County Members of the Legislative Yuan
Members of the 7th Legislative Yuan